Antaeotricha leptogramma is a moth of the family Depressariidae. It is found in French Guiana.

The wingspan is about 22 mm for males and 30 mm for females. The forewings are glossy slaty-grey with the costal edge white and all veins marked with fine white lines, faint or obsolete on the anterior two-fifths of the wing, beyond the cell with the interneural spaces paler and whitish-tinged, but the veins margined with dark grey lines. The hindwings are grey with costal hairscales suffused with darker grey beneath and with the subcostal hair-pencil white.

References

Moths described in 1916
leptogramma
Moths of South America
Taxa named by Edward Meyrick